Tayside Police was a territorial police force covering the Scottish council areas of Angus, City of Dundee and Perth and Kinross (the former Tayside region) until 1 April 2013, at which point it was subsumed into Police Scotland. The force operated from 27 police stations and has an establishment of 1078 police officers, 151 special constables and 594 support staff, as of February 2008. Tayside Police was Scotland's fourth-largest police force.

History 
It was formed on 16 May 1975, with the region of Tayside, as an amalgamation of the Perth and Kinross Constabulary, Angus Constabulary and City of Dundee Police. The force was operationally subdivided into three Divisions, equating to the respective council areas - Western Division serves Perth and Kinross, Eastern Division serves Angus and Central Division serves the City of Dundee.

The work of the force was overseen by the Tayside Police Joint Board, whose 18 members are nominated by the respective councils (7 by Dundee, 6 by Perth & Kinross, 5 by Angus).

Tayside Police were the first in Scotland and the UK to pilot new social media software, MyPolice, launched on 17 January 2011. In a three-month pilot, ten local community officers from the Southern Perthshire area tested the software by replying to community concerns, and using Twitter to engage with communities.

An Act of the Scottish Parliament, the Police and Fire Reform (Scotland) Act 2012, created a single Police Service of Scotland - known as Police Scotland - with effect from 1 April 2013. This merged the eight regional police forces in Scotland (including Tayside Police), together with the Scottish Crime and Drug Enforcement Agency, into a single service covering the whole of Scotland. Police Scotland will have its headquarters at the Scottish Police College at Tulliallan in Fife.

Executive

Legacy Tayside command structure:
 Chief Constable - Justine Curran
 Deputy Chief Constable - Gordon Scobbie 
 Assistant Chief Constable (Temp) - A Wilson
 Director of Corporate Services - Douglas Cross OBE FCMA

Positions subsumed into the unified Police Service of Scotland “Police Scotland” from 1 April 2013. Currently the Chief Constable is Iain Livingstone QPM who was first appointed on the 15th of August 2018 and would formally take office on the 27th of August, same year.

References

External links
Tayside Police Museum on Facebook
Former Official website

Defunct police forces of Scotland
Angus, Scotland
Organisations based in Dundee
Perth and Kinross
Government agencies established in 1975
1975 establishments in Scotland
Government agencies disestablished in 2013
2013 disestablishments in Scotland